Lecokia is a monotypic genus of flowering plants belonging to the family Apiaceae. It just contains one species, Lecokia cretica (Lam.) DC. 

It is native to Cyprus, the East Aegean Islands, Iran, Crete, Lebanon, Palestine, South Caucasus (of Armenia, Georgia and Azerbaijan), Syria, and Turkey.
 
The genus name of Lecokia is in honour of Henri Lecoq (1802–1871), a French botanist. The genus has 2 known synonyms of Apolgusa  and Conilaria 

The Latin specific epithet of cretica means "coming from Crete, where the plant was found.
Both the genus and the species were first described and published in Coll. Mém. Vol.5 on page 67 in 1829.

References

Apioideae
Plants described in 1829
Flora of Crete
Flora of the Transcaucasus
Flora of Western Asia
Monotypic Apioideae genera